Lipsanen is a Finnish surname. Notable people with the surname include:

 Danny (born 1942, real name Ilkka Lipsanen), Finnish singer and guitarist
 Simo Lipsanen (born 1995), Finnish athlete

Finnish-language surnames